In the development of the human embryo, the intraembryonic coelom (or somatic coelom) is a portion of the conceptus forming in the mesoderm during the third week of development. During the third week of development, the lateral plate mesoderm splits into a dorsal somatic mesoderm (somatopleure) and a ventral splanchnic mesoderm (splanchnopleure). The resulting cavity between the somatopleure and splanchnopleure is called the intraembryonic coelom. This space will give rise to the thoracic and abdominal cavities. The coelomic spaces in the lateral mesoderm and cardiogenic area are isolated. The isolated coelom begins to organize into a horseshoe shape. The spaces soon join together and form a single horseshoe-shaped cavity: the intraembryonic coelom. It then separates the mesoderm into two layers.

It briefly has a connection with the extraembryonic coelom.

See also
 Cavitation (embryology)

References

External links
 http://www.embryology.ch/anglais/hdisqueembry/triderm09.html 
 https://web.archive.org/web/20071016082700/http://embryology.med.unsw.edu.au/Notes/coelom.htm
 https://web.archive.org/web/20070718112630/http://www.ana.ed.ac.uk/database/humat/notes/embryo/cavities/coelom.htm

Embryology